Thomas Dick may refer to:
 Thomas Dick (politician) (1823–1900), New Zealand politician
 Thomas Dick (scientist) (1774–1857), Scottish church minister, science teacher and writer
 Thomas Dick (hotelier) (1809–1874), of Queen's Hotel, Toronto
 Thomas Dick (gymnast) (1880–1938), British Olympic gymnast
 Thomas Pattinson Dick (1903–1979), English badminton international

See also
 
 Thomas Dick-Lauder
 Dick Thomas (disambiguation)